Metropolis was a town in Perrhaebia in Ancient Thessaly. Stephanus of Byzantium calls it simply a town in Thessaly, distinct from its more-renowned namesake. 

This appears to be the Metropolis mentioned by Livy in his account of the campaign of Antiochus III, in 191 BCE, where it is related that the Syrian king having landed at Demetrias, first took Pherae, then Crannon, then Cypaera, Metropolis, and all the neighbouring fortresses, except Atrax and Gyrton, and afterwards proceeded to Larissa. From this account it would appear that this Metropolis was in Perrhaebia; and its site has been discovered by William Martin Leake, near that of Atrax, at Kastri village in the municipal unit of Lakereia, where the name of Μητροπολίτης occurs in an inscription.

References

Cities in ancient Greece
Populated places in ancient Thessaly
Former populated places in Greece
Perrhaebia